Wilfried Dietrich (14 October 1933 – 2 June 1992) was a German heavyweight wrestler. Between 1956 and 1972 he took part in five Olympics and six world championships, often entering both the freestyle and Greco-Roman wrestling contests – a feat unmatched by any other wrestler. He won five Olympic and five world championship medals, becoming Olympic (1960), world (1961) and European champion (1967). Between 1955 and 1962 he won all his freestyle bouts.

In 1968 Dietrich  was selected as the Olympic flag bearer for West Germany at its first appearance at summer Olympics; he won a bronze medal at those games. He failed to medal at his last Olympics in 1972, yet he produced the most spectacular victory of his career by throwing over his back the 182 kg American Chris Taylor in the Greco-Roman contest. Dietrich lost to Taylor in their freestyle bout. In 2008 he was inducted into the Germany's Sports Hall of Fame and in 2014 to the International Wrestling Hall of Fame.

References

External links

1933 births
1992 deaths
Olympic wrestlers of the United Team of Germany
Olympic wrestlers of West Germany
Wrestlers at the 1956 Summer Olympics
Wrestlers at the 1960 Summer Olympics
Wrestlers at the 1964 Summer Olympics
Wrestlers at the 1968 Summer Olympics
Wrestlers at the 1972 Summer Olympics
German male sport wrestlers
Olympic gold medalists for the United Team of Germany
Olympic silver medalists for the United Team of Germany
Olympic bronze medalists for the United Team of Germany
Olympic bronze medalists for West Germany
Olympic medalists in wrestling
World Wrestling Championships medalists
Medalists at the 1968 Summer Olympics
Medalists at the 1964 Summer Olympics
Medalists at the 1960 Summer Olympics
Medalists at the 1956 Summer Olympics
European Wrestling Championships medalists
20th-century German people
World Wrestling Champions